The Sanremo Music Festival 1997 was the 47th annual Sanremo Music Festival, held at the Teatro Ariston in Sanremo, province of Imperia, in the late February 1997 and broadcast by Rai 1.

The show was presented by Mike Bongiorno (in his eleventh and final hosting of the Festival), supported by Piero Chiambretti and Valeria Marini. Composers Pino Donaggio and Giorgio Moroder and lyricist Carla Vistarini served as the artistic directors.

The winners of the Big Artists section were the pop duo Jalisse with the song "Fiumi di parole". As a result, the duo was eligible to represent Italy in the Eurovision Song Contest 1997, in which they eventually ranked fourth. It was a surprise return for Italy after having sat out the contest since , as well as the first Italian entry chosen through Sanremo since . They would withdraw following the 1997 contest and wouldn't return until .

Paola e Chiara won the "Newcomers" section with the song "Amici come prima", and Patty Pravo won the Mia Martini Critics Award with the song "E dimmi che non vuoi morire".

For the newcomers, only the winner was revealed; for the big artists section, initially only the first three positions were announced, while the complete final ranking was disclosed only several weeks after the end of the festival.

In this edition, a "Quality Jury", responsible for rewarding the best music, best lyrics and best arrangement, was introduced. The 1997 jury was headed by Luciano Pavarotti and consisted of Bill Conti, Gino Paoli, Nicola Piovani and Mario Missiroli (who replaced Gabriele Salvatores, who suffered a flu).

Starting from the second night, the journalist Bruno Vespa hosted DopoFestival, a talk show about the Festival with the participation of singers, politicians and journalists.

Participants and results

Big Artists

Newcomers

Guests

References 

Sanremo Music Festival by year
1997 in Italian music 
1997 in Italian television 
1997 music festivals